Rabbi Yitzchok Isaac ben Dov Ber Krasilschikov (1888 – May 13, 1965), also known as the Gaon of Poltava, was an exceptional Talmudic scholar and author of a monumental commentary on the Jerusalem Talmud. He was one of the last publicly practicing Orthodox rabbis in Communist Russia.

Early years
Born in 1888 in the small Belarusian town of Kritchev to Rabbi Dov Ber Krasilschikov, he studied in the Mir yeshiva under the renowned Gaon Rabbi Eliyahu Baruch Kamai, who was his primary teacher and mentor. Before the Communist Revolution in Russia, Rabbi Yitzchok Isaac served as the Rabbi of Heditz, then of Poltava, the town from which he gained acclaim as the 'Gaon of Poltava'. It was there, in 1926, that he printed Tevunah, the first volume of his commentary on the Rambam, which he had written when he was but 23 years old. This was the last Jewish religious work published in Communist Russia. During World War II he managed to avoid the Nazis by residing in Siberia.

When the Communist authorities increased their persecution of those who studied Torah, primarily targeting the great rabbis of Russia, Rabbi Krasilschikov left the rabbinate and settled in Moscow, where he took a job as an accountant. He lived with his wife in a modest little apartment near the Kremlin, where, after each day working for the government, he returned home to immerse himself in Torah study during the night. It was there that the last rabbis of Russia came to hear the Torah emanating from his mouth. He ate only dry foods, for there was also a non-Jewish woman who cooked non-Kosher food in his kitchen (it was a communal kitchen, shared by those in the apartment complex). He did not cease wearing his rabbinic-style clothes, and throughout his life he acted like a Rabbi from a generation of long ago.

Rabbi Krasilschikov is survived by two daughters who currently live in Brooklyn, New York.

Talmudic commentaries
Rabbi Krasilschikov authored a 20-volume dual-commentary on the Talmud Yerushalmi in Moscow between the years 1952-1965. However, this was done in secrecy, due to fear of and oppression by the Communist regime, which had outlawed the study of Torah. Violators of this ban were subject to severe punishment and exile to Siberia. The work of Rabbi Krasilschikov was done without the benefit of any formal academy, and with very few reference works. It is reported that he did not even have a complete set of Talmud Bavli.

Deathbed confession
On May 12, 1965, Rabbi Yehudah Leib Levin, the Chief Rabbi of Moscow, asked the visiting American Rabbi Harry (Tzvi) Bronstein of the Al Tidom Association to accompany him to visit Rabbi Krasilschikov, who was lying gravely ill in hospital. At the hospital, Rabbi Krasilschikov confided to Rabbi Bronstein that beneath his cushion was the second volume of his manuscript, Tevunah on the Rambam, which he asked Rabbi Bonstein to publish. However, he cautioned Rabbi Bronstein to be very careful when removing the manuscript; he feared that some of the nurses were secret agents of the KGB. Rabbi Bronstein responded that although he could not guarantee success in smuggling the manuscript out from behind the Iron Curtain, if he did manage he would commit to publishing it. In 1976, Rabbi Bronstein was able to keep his word and printed the second volume of Tevunah, fifty years after the first volume had been published in Poltava.

During the same meeting Rabbi Krasilschikov also confided that he had written a dual commentary that would make the study of the Jerusalem Talmud far easier for those who wished to learn it. The twenty volumes containing some twenty thousand pages were, at the time, hidden in his daughters houses. On the following day, May 13, 1965, Rabbi Krasilschikov died.

Saga of escape
True to his word, Rabbi Bronstein tried to smuggle Rabbi Krasilschikov's Talmudic works out of the country. During his first attempt, all twenty volumes were microfilmed and brought to the American Embassy in Moscow, from where they were to be taken out of the country via diplomatic pouch. However, on the night before they were to be flown out, a fire broke out on the eighth floor of the American Embassy and the microfilm was destroyed.

After making many more unsuccessful attempts, Rabbi Bronstein was arrested on June 5, 1967 at the airport in Kiev, declared persona non grata, deported from the country, and forbidden to enter any Soviet-controlled state ever again. However, he continued his efforts to smuggle the manuscripts out through intermediaries.

Finally, on the 17th attempt, the first of the twenty volumes was successfully smuggled out of Russia by Rabbi Yaakov Pollack, the Rabbi of Congregation Shomrei Emunah of Borough Park in Brooklyn, New York. After that event, with the help of friendly consular representatives Rabbi Bronstein was successful in removing the entire manuscript and bringing it to a safe place.

Publication
In 1980, the Mutzal Me’esh Institute of Bnai Brak, under Rabbi Bronstein's auspices, published the first volume of Rabbi Krasilschikov’s commentary, on Tractate Berachot. This volume, edited by a team of scholars headed up by Rabbi Shacna Koliditzki, includes the text of the Yerushalmi surrounded by the dual commentaries of Rabbi Krasilschikov, titled Toldos Yitzchak and Tivuna. The Toldos Yitzchak commentary is a clear and lucid explanation of the Yerushalmi, while Tivuna is a more detailed discussion of issues in the Yerushalmi that also contains emendations to its text.

The printing of the Yerushalmi with the commentaries of Rabbi Krasilschikov is an ongoing effort which is currently under the auspices of Rabbi Chaim Kanievsky and, until his passing in 2010, Rabbi Yisroel Elya Weintraub, zt"l. The following tractates have been published thus far:
Berachot, two volumes (1980)
Sheviit (1982)
Pe'ah (1985)
Demai (1988)
Kil'ayim (1989)
Terumot (1987)
Maaserot and Hallah, single volume (1991)
Ma'aser Sheni (1991)
Orlah and Bikkurim, single volume (1995)
Shabbat
Eruvin

As time passes, the commentary of Rabbi Krasilschikov, with glowing approbations from Rabbi Moshe Feinstein and Rabbi Yosef Shalom Eliashiv, is being recognized as the best, clearest, and most straightforward explanation of the Yerushalmi.

References
Rabbi Yitzchak Isaac Krasilschikov – commentator of the Yerushalmi
Three Commentaries on the Talmud
A Short Biography of Rabbi Yitzchak Isaac Krasilschikov

Belarusian Haredi rabbis
Russian Haredi rabbis
1965 deaths
1888 births
Authors of works on the Jerusalem Talmud
Mir Yeshiva alumni